HMS Fernie was a Type I Hunt-class destroyer built for the Royal Navy completed in mid-1940. She was adopted by the Civil Community of Market Harborough, Leicestershire, as part of the Warship Week campaign in 1942. She has been the only ship in the Royal Navy to carry this name.

Service history
On commissioning in 1940 Fernie completed work ups for service the English Channel. She provided escort cover during the evacuation of troops from French Channel Ports in June 1940. The following month she provided escort cover during the laying of the minefield of the northern barrage, north of North Rona. During the rest of the year she undertook escort duties in the English Channel.

During 1941 and 1942 she continued escort duties in the English Channel and North sea. In August 1942 she was part of the escort force supporting the landings in the abortive Dieppe Raid and was subject to heavy air attack during the raid.

In 1943 Fernie undertook convoy defence in the North Sea. In the following year was nominated to provide support for the Allied landings in Normandy. She then returned to convoy escort and patrol duties in the North Sea and English Channel.

After August 1945 she was used as an air target ship at Rosyth. She was subsequently placed in reserve at Chatham. She was then sold to BISCO for scrap. She arrived for scrapping at Port Glasgow on 7 November 1956.

References

Publications

External links
 Profile on naval-history.net

 

Hunt-class destroyers of the Royal Navy
Naval ships of Operation Neptune
Ships built on the River Clyde
1939 ships
World War II destroyers of the United Kingdom